The Fire Safety Act 2021 (c. 24) an act of the Parliament of the United Kingdom which arose out of the 2017 Grenfell Tower fire and relates to fire safety in buildings in England and Wales with two or more domestic residences, making changes to the Regulatory Reform (Fire Safety) Order 2005 (the "Fire Safety Order"). It was sponsored by the Home Office.

The bill received royal assent on 29 April 2021.

The Fire Protection Association welcomed the legislation, noting that it "makes good a long-standing issue about who is responsible for the fire safety of communal doors, external walls and anything attached, such as balconies", but also regretting that provision was not made to exclude a requirement for leaseholders to pay for remedial works to remove dangerous cladding from their buildings.

Contents
The Act includes the following provisions:
those responsible for the fire safety of a building will be required to share information about its external walls with the local fire and rescue service
building owners or managers will have to inspect flat entrance doors annually and lifts monthly, notifying the local fire and rescue service if there are any faults with the lifts
residents of buildings with two or more flats will need to have access to evacuation and fire safety instructions provided by the building owner or manager
a public register of fire risk assessments will be established
future changes to be made to identify which premises are covered by the Fire Safety Order, without further primary legislation.

References

Fire prevention law
Fire protection
Acts of the Parliament of the United Kingdom concerning England and Wales
Fire and rescue in the United Kingdom
Housing legislation in the United Kingdom
Local government legislation in England and Wales
United Kingdom Acts of Parliament 2021
2021 in British law